Lake Sarah may refer to:

Cities, towns, townships etc.
Lake Sarah Township, Minnesota in Murray County, Minnesota

Lakes
Lake Sarah, a lake in western Hennepin County, Minnesota. Identified as MN DNR #27-0191 lake Sarah is located in sections 1 and 2, township 118, range 24; and in sections 34 and 35, township 119, range 24, GPS 45°4'19"N 93°41'24"W surrounded by the Minnesota cities of Independence, Greenfield, Loretto, Medina, and Rockford. 
Lake Sarah, a lake in Murray County, Minnesota
Lake Sarah, a lake in Polk County, Minnesota
Lake Sarah, a lake in the Hunter Island region of the Quetico Provincial Park, Ontario, Canada